Armwell Long (February 17, 1754 – November 22, 1834) was an American military officer and politician. He served in the Revolutionary War, being close friends with George Washington, was one of Delaware's commanding lieutenant colonels during the War of 1812, and served six terms in the Delaware General Assembly as a member of the House of Representatives.

Early life
Long was born in Worcester County, Maryland, on February 17, 1754. He was one of ten children born to David Long and Ann Lockwood. He was an active member of the Prince George's Chapel in Dagsboro, Delaware, and married Elizabeth Robinson in July 1773. He served in the Revolutionary War, being close friends with George Washington. According to an article published in the Delmarva News, Long at one point in his military career outranked Washington, although this claim is dubious.

Career 
Long lived in what is now Frankford following the war. On April 5, 1790, on Easter Monday, Long was appointed a vestryman at the Prince George's Chapel. His family owned the fifth pew at the church until at least 1822. When his father, David, died in 1791, Armwell was named the executor of will.

Long became commissioner of the Levy Court in 1798, and served four years in the position. He later served six terms in the Delaware House of Representatives. Long was first elected to serve in the 24th Delaware General Assembly, in 1800, and was reelected each year until being succeeded by Jesse Green in 1805, during the 29th Delaware General Assembly. He was elected for one more term in 1808, being both the successor and predecessor to Green.

On April 18, 1806, the Delaware Militia was created by an Act of Congress. On October 5, in the following year, Long was appointed by governor Nathaniel Mitchell lieutenant colonel of the 10th Delaware Regiment. He was later switched to the 12th Regiment by Joseph Haslet, making Long the controller of ensign Joseph V. Crockett, lieutenant Benjamin Burton, and an additional 66 privates and non-commissioned officers.

In April 1813, as part of the War of 1812, the town of Lewes was being bombarded by the British. Long, who had become commander of the 10th Regiment again, was ordered by the United States Secretary of War to report to General Joseph Bloomfield in New Castle as quickly as possible. Long and his regiment were then sent to Lewes, and he served as an important figure in protecting the town and driving back the British.

Long was officially recommissioned lieutenant colonel on October 15, 1814, and was reappointed commander of his regiment. He finished his military service in the Delaware Militia in 1817. There were claims that he had been injured in the War of 1812, and although he did need a cane or wheelchair to move around in the subsequent years of his life, this was not true.

Later years and death 
Long was very wealthy, and lived with his wife on a large piece of land called the "Forest Flower," which he had inherited from his father. His family had been given that land originally in 1682, as a grant from Lord Baltimore. One map from 1818 showed Long as owning all of the space on one side of Frankford's main street. Some said that it was possible to "walk from Selbyville to Frankford on Colonel Armwell Long's property."

Long was the leader of his family and was described as being a "very influential man in Delaware affairs," with mentions of him being on numerous county and state records. His descendants were also prominent in the lower part of Delaware, with Fred Travers of the Delmarva News writing, "The history of Southeastern Sussex County and descendants of Armwell Long are intertwined over and over." One of his sons, Isaiah (1783–1832), was the first Frankford merchant and has been called the town's "founding father."

Long died on November 22, 1834, at the age of 80. His personal items and lands were divided among his children after his death. He was buried in his family's burial grounds, which were later made into a public cemetery named "Colonel Armwell Long Cemetery" in his honor in 1927. He also had a chapter in the Daughters of the American Revolution named for him. A book about Sussex County described Long as "a great man."

References

1754 births
1834 deaths
Members of the Delaware House of Representatives
People from Worcester County, Maryland
People from Sussex County, Delaware
People of Delaware in the American Revolution